In 1937, during the Spanish Civil War, Italians from the Corpo Truppe Volontarie began to serve in mixed Italo-Spanish Flechas (Arrows) units where the Italians provided the officers and technical personnel, while the Spanish served in the rank-and-file. One, the Flechas Negras Mixed Brigade "Black Arrows" first served in Vizcaya from April 1937.

Order of Battle, April 1937 

Flechas Negras Brigade - Col. Sandro Piazzoni 
 3rd Regiment 
 1st Battalion
 2nd Battalion
 3rd Battalion
 Battery 65/17 
 4th Regiment 
 1st Battalion
 2nd Battalion
 3rd Battalion 
 Battery 65/17 
 Assault Battalion
 1st Company 
 2nd Company
 Artillery Group
 IVº Grupo de 75/27 
 Grupo de 100/17 
 Grupo de 105/28 
 Battery 20mm AA
 Engineer Company
 Intendencia Section 
 Sanitation Section

Order of Battle, Battle of Santander August 1937 

Flechas Negras Brigade - Col. Sandro Piazzoni 
 3rd Regiment 
 1st Battalion "Monte Jata" 
 2nd Battalion "Bermeo" 
 3rd Battalion "Munguia" 
 Battery 65/17 
 Engineer Section 
 4th Regiment  
 1st Battalion "Peña Amarilla" 
 2nd Battalion 
 3rd Battalion "Algorta" 
 Battery 65/17 
 Engineer Section 
 Assault Battalion 
 Artillery Group 
 Group 75/27 
 Battery 149/12 
 Antitank Battery 37mm 
 Battery 20mm AA
 Engineer Company 
 Division Truck Unit

The Flechas Negras Brigade was later expanded to form the Flechas Division.

See also 
 Flechas Azules Mixed Brigade

Sources 
de Mesa, José Luis, El regreso de las legiones: (la ayuda militar italiana a la España nacional, 1936-1939),  García Hispán, Granada:España, 1994 

Military units and formations of the Spanish Civil War
Military units and formations of Italy in the Spanish Civil War